The National Workers' Movement (NWM) is a trade union in Saint Vincent and the Grenadines. It is affiliated with the International Trade Union Confederation.

References

Trade unions in Saint Vincent and the Grenadines
International Trade Union Confederation